The 1932 Chicago Cubs season was the 61st season of the Chicago Cubs franchise, the 57th in the National League and the 17th at Wrigley Field. The Cubs finished first in the National League with a record of 90–64, four games ahead of the second place Pittsburgh Pirates. The team was swept four games to none by the New York Yankees in the 1932 World Series.

Regular season

Season standings

Record vs. opponents

Notable transactions 
 August 3, 1932: Rogers Hornsby was released by the Cubs.

Roster

Player stats

Batting

Starters by position 
Note: Pos = Position; G = Games played; AB = At bats; H = Hits; Avg. = Batting average; HR = Home runs; RBI = Runs batted in

Other batters 
Note: G = Games played; AB = At bats; H = Hits; Avg. = Batting average; HR = Home runs; RBI = Runs batted in

Pitching

Starting pitchers 
Note: G = Games pitched; IP = Innings pitched; W = Wins; L = Losses; ERA = Earned run average; SO = Strikeouts

Other pitchers 
Note: G = Games pitched; IP = Innings pitched; W = Wins; L = Losses; ERA = Earned run average; SO = Strikeouts

Relief pitchers 
Note: G = Games pitched; W = Wins; L = Losses; SV = Saves; ERA = Earned run average; SO = Strikeouts

1932 World Series 

AL New York Yankees (4) vs. NL Chicago Cubs (0)

"Babe Ruth's called shot" was the home run hit by Babe Ruth in the fifth inning of Game 3 of the 1932 World Series, held on October 1, 1932, at Wrigley Field in Chicago. During the at bat, which came against Charlie Root, Ruth made a pointing gesture, which existing film confirms, but the exact nature of his gesture is ambiguous. Although neither fully confirmed nor refuted, the story goes that Ruth pointed to the center field bleachers during the at bat. It was supposedly a declaration that he would hit a home run to this part of the park. On the next pitch, Ruth hit a home run to center field.

Farm system

Notes

References 
1932 Chicago Cubs season at Baseball Reference

Chicago Cubs seasons
Chicago Cubs season
National League champion seasons
Chicago Cubs